Clostridium aestuarii  is a halophilic, strictly anaerobic, spore-forming, rod-shaped and motile bacterium from the genus Clostridium which has been isolated from tidal flat sediments.

References

 

Bacteria described in 2007
aestuarii